Sharon Spencer (born October 10, 1947) is an American politician who served in the West Virginia House of Delegates from the 30th district from 1982 to 1984 and from 1986 to 1994 and from 1996 to 2010.

References

1947 births
Living people
Democratic Party members of the West Virginia House of Delegates